Miss Universe Panamá 2022 was the first Miss Universe Panamá pageant and 56th Miss Panamá selection, held to select Panama's representative to the Miss Universe pageant. This was the first edition of the renewed Miss Universe Panama Pageant, after the Miss Universe organization awarded the license to event producer Ricardo Canto who had been named the new director of the pageant in 2022.

Ten preliminary contestants were selected from all over Panama and competed for the crown. Miss Panamá Universe 2021 Brenda Andrea Smith Lezama of Panamá Centro crowned Solaris De la Luna Barba Cañizales  of Herrera as her successor at the end of the event.

Barba represented Panama at Miss Universe 2022, held at the New Orleans Morial Convention Center in New Orleans, Louisiana, United States on January 14, 2023, but failed to make it to the Top 16.

History

In 2022 the Señorita Panamá Organization lost the right of Miss Universe pageant. Ricardo Canto acquire the rights of the title "Miss Universe Panamá" creating a new contest that will select the representative to Miss Universe separately.

Final results

Costume selection
Held on September 7, was the election for the Best National Costume. In this competition, the contestants were not evaluated, only the costumes. 

The event showcased the creative work of Panamanian designers and also selected the costume for Panama at Miss Universe 2022. Some costumes were also elected to represent Panama in other beauty contests.

Judges
Claudia De Villalba: Businesswoman
Eduardo Lowe: Co-Editor and Creative Director of The Reviewer magazine
Gladys Brandao: Miss Panamá 2015
David Bobadilla: Stylist and makeup artist
Gina Faarup De Cochez: Producer, film and theater actress
Rina Laxman Aswani: Businesswoman

Contestants 
These are the competitors who have been selected this year.

References

Señorita Panamá
2022 beauty pageants
2022 in Panama